Didier Angan (born 27 December 1974) is a former Ivorian footballer who played as a defender.

Club career
Angan previously played for Stade Briochin and OGC Nice in Ligue 2.

International career
He represented Ivory Coast in the 1998 and 2000 African Cup of Nations.

References

1974 births
Living people
Ivorian footballers
Ivorian expatriate footballers
Ivory Coast international footballers
1998 African Cup of Nations players
2000 African Cup of Nations players
Ligue 2 players
Serie B players
Austrian Football Bundesliga players
Paris Saint-Germain F.C. players
OGC Nice players
SK Sturm Graz players
Hellas Verona F.C. players
F.C. Grosseto S.S.D. players
U.S. Catanzaro 1929 players
AC Ajaccio players
Expatriate footballers in France
Expatriate footballers in Italy
Expatriate footballers in Austria
Stade Briochin players
Footballers from Abidjan
Association football defenders